The arrondissement of Alès is an arrondissement of France in the Gard department in the Occitanie region. It has 97 communes.

Composition

The communes of the arrondissement of Alès, and their INSEE codes, are:

 Alès (30007)
 Allègre-les-Fumades (30008)
 Anduze (30010)
 Aujac (30022)
 Bagard (30027)
 Barjac (30029)
 Bessèges (30037)
 Boisset-et-Gaujac (30042)
 Bonnevaux (30044)
 Bordezac (30045)
 Boucoiran-et-Nozières (30046)
 Bouquet (30048)
 Branoux-les-Taillades (30051)
 Brignon (30053)
 Brouzet-lès-Alès (30055)
 Castelnau-Valence (30072)
 Cendras (30077)
 Chambon (30079)
 Chamborigaud (30080)
 Concoules (30090)
 Corbès (30094)
 Courry (30097)
 Cruviers-Lascours (30100)
 Deaux (30101)
 Euzet (30109)
 Gagnières (30120)
 Générargues (30129)
 Génolhac (30130)
 La Grand-Combe (30132)
 Lamelouze (30137)
 Laval-Pradel (30142)
 Lézan (30147)
 Les Mages (30152)
 Malons-et-Elze (30153)
 Martignargues (30158)
 Le Martinet (30159)
 Massanes (30161)
 Massillargues-Attuech (30162)
 Méjannes-le-Clap (30164)
 Méjannes-lès-Alès (30165)
 Meyrannes (30167)
 Mialet (30168)
 Molières-sur-Cèze (30171)
 Mons (30173)
 Monteils (30177)
 Navacelles (30187)
 Ners (30188)
 Peyremale (30194)
 Les Plans (30197)
 Ponteils-et-Brésis (30201)
 Portes (30203)
 Potelières (30204)
 Ribaute-les-Tavernes (30214)
 Rivières (30215)
 Robiac-Rochessadoule (30216)
 Rochegude (30218)
 Rousson (30223)
 Saint-Ambroix (30227)
 Saint-Bonnet-de-Salendrinque (30236)
 Saint-Brès (30237)
 Saint-Césaire-de-Gauzignan (30240)
 Saint-Christol-lès-Alès (30243)
 Saint-Denis (30247)
 Sainte-Cécile-d'Andorge (30239)
 Sainte-Croix-de-Caderle (30246)
 Saint-Étienne-de-l'Olm (30250)
 Saint-Florent-sur-Auzonnet (30253)
 Saint-Hilaire-de-Brethmas (30259)
 Saint-Hippolyte-de-Caton (30261)
 Saint-Jean-de-Ceyrargues (30264)
 Saint-Jean-de-Maruéjols-et-Avéjan (30266)
 Saint-Jean-de-Serres (30267)
 Saint-Jean-de-Valériscle (30268)
 Saint-Jean-du-Gard (30269)
 Saint-Jean-du-Pin (30270)
 Saint-Julien-de-Cassagnas (30271)
 Saint-Julien-les-Rosiers (30274)
 Saint-Just-et-Vacquières (30275)
 Saint-Martin-de-Valgalgues (30284)
 Saint-Maurice-de-Cazevieille (30285)
 Saint-Paul-la-Coste (30291)
 Saint-Privat-de-Champclos (30293)
 Saint-Privat-des-Vieux (30294)
 Saint-Sébastien-d'Aigrefeuille (30298)
 Saint-Victor-de-Malcap (30303)
 Salindres (30305)
 Les Salles-du-Gardon (30307)
 Sénéchas (30316)
 Servas (30318)
 Seynes (30320)
 Soustelle (30323)
 Tharaux (30327)
 Thoiras (30329)
 Tornac (30330)
 Vabres (30335)
 La Vernarède (30345)
 Vézénobres (30348)

History

The arrondissement of Alès was created in 1800. At the January 2017 reorganisation of the arrondissements of Gard, it gained four communes from the arrondissement of Le Vigan, and it lost two communes to the arrondissement of Nîmes and six communes to the arrondissement of Le Vigan.

As a result of the reorganisation of the cantons of France which came into effect in 2015, the borders of the cantons are no longer related to the borders of the arrondissements. The cantons of the arrondissement of Alès were, as of January 2015:

 Alès-Nord-Est
 Alès-Ouest
 Alès-Sud-Est
 Anduze
 Barjac
 Bessèges
 Génolhac
 La Grand-Combe
 Lédignan
 Saint-Ambroix
 Saint-Jean-du-Gard
 Vézénobres

References

Ales